The following is a list of the MuchMusic Video Awards winners for Best International Group Video.

MuchMusic Video Awards